Splicing factor 3B subunit 2 is a protein that in humans is encoded by the SF3B2 gene.

Function 

This gene encodes subunit 2 of the splicing factor 3b protein complex. Splicing factor 3b, together with splicing factor 3a and a 12S RNA unit, forms the U2 small nuclear ribonucleoproteins complex (U2 snRNP). The splicing factor 3b/3a complex binds pre-mRNA upstream of the intron's branch site in a sequence-independent manner and may anchor the U2 snRNP to the pre-mRNA. Splicing factor 3b is also a component of the minor U12-type spliceosome. Subunit 2 associates with pre-mRNA upstream of the branch site at the anchoring site. Subunit 2 also interacts directly with subunit 4 of the splicing factor 3b complex. Subunit 2 is a highly hydrophilic protein with a proline-rich N-terminus and a glutamate-rich stretch in the C-terminus.

Interactions 

SF3B2 has been shown to interact with SF3B4, RBM7, SF3B1 and CDC5L.

References

Further reading